Gary Robinson is an American software engineer and mathematician and inventor notable for his mathematical algorithms to fight spam. In addition, he patented a method to use web browser cookies to track consumers across different web sites, allowing marketers to better match advertisements with consumers. The patent was bought by DoubleClick, and then DoubleClick was bought by Google. He is credited as being one of the first to use automated collaborative filtering technologies to turn word-of-mouth recommendations into useful data.

Algorithms to identify spam
In 2003, Robinson's article in Linux Journal detailed a new approach to computer programming perhaps best described as a general purpose classifier which expanded on the usefulness of Bayesian filtering. Robinson's method used math-intensive algorithms combined with Chi-square statistical testing to enable computers to examine an unknown file and make intelligent guesses about what was in it. The technique had wide applicability; for example, Robinson's method enabled computers to examine a file and guess, with much greater accuracy, whether it contained pornography, or whether an incoming email to a corporation was a technical question or a sales-related question. The method became the basis for anti-spam techniques used by Tim Peters and Rob Hooft of the influential SpamBayes project. Spamming is the abuse of electronic messaging systems to send unsolicited, undesired bulk messages. SpamBayes assigned probability scores to both spam and ham (useful emails) to guess intelligently whether an incoming email was spam; the scoring system enabled the program to return a value of unsure if both the spam and ham scores were high. Robinson's method was used in other anti-spam projects such as SpamAssassin. Robinson commented in Linux Journal on how fighting spam was a collaborative effort:

In 1996, Robinson patented a method to help marketers focus their online advertisements to consumers. He explained:

Entrepreneurial activity
In 2010, Robinson was the chief technology officer at FlyFi, an online music service owned by Maine-based Emergent Discovery which uses his anti-spam programming techniques along with collaborative filtering technologies to help make music recommendations to web users. His blog Gary Robinson's Rants has been quoted by others in the computer and online music industries and cited by academic papers. Robinson helped develop recommendation engine technology which applies high-power mathematical techniques using software algorithms to have a computer guess intelligently about what a consumer might like. For example, if a consumer likes music by artists such as the Beach Boys, Bob Dylan and the Talking Heads, the computer software will match these preferences with a much larger dataset of other consumers who also like those three artists but which cumulatively has much greater musical knowledge than the single consumer. Accordingly, the computer will find music that the user might like but hasn't been exposed to, and therefore hopefully offer intelligent recommendations, in a process which has come to be called knowledge management. But the mathematics behind such comparisons can become quite complex and involved. Robinson studied mathematics at Bard College and graduated in 1979 and studied further at the Courant Institute of New York University. In the 1980s, Robinson worked on an entrepreneurial start-up dating service called 212-Romance which used similar computer algorithms to match singles romantically. The New York City-based voice mail dating service created community-based automated recommendations and used collaborative filtering technologies which Robinson developed further in other capacities.

References

External links
 Gary Robinson's Rants blog
 Automated collaborative filtering patent

Bard College alumni
American software engineers
People from Bronxville, New York
People from Maine
Living people
1956 births
American chief technology officers
Courant Institute of Mathematical Sciences alumni
Engineers from New York (state)